Mauvilla or similar terms may refer to:

 variant of Mabila, a Mississippian fortress town
 the origin of the name for Mobile, Alabama
 the Bahia de la Mobila, which was named in English Mobile Bay
 Mobilian, a tribe in Alabama
 the towboat Mauvilla in the 1993 Big Bayou Canot train wreck
 the Mavilla Bridge in Puerto Rico
 Mavilla, Vega Alta, Puerto Rico, a barrio